The 1999 European Cup was the 20th edition of the European Cup of athletics.

The Super League Finals were held in Paris, France.

Super Leagues

Held on 19 and 20 June in Paris, France

Team standings

Results summary

Men's events

Women's events

First League
The First League was held on 5 and 6 June

Men

Group A
Held in Lahti, Finland

Group B
Held in Athens, Greece

Women

Group A
Held in Lahti, Finland

Group B
Held in Athens, Greece

Second League
The Second League was held on 5 and 6 June

Men

Group A
Held in Pula, Croatia

Group B
Held in Tel Aviv, Israel

Women

Group A
Held in Pula, Croatia

Group B
Held in Tel Aviv, Israel

References

External links
European Cup results (Men) from GBR Athletics
European Cup results (Women) from GBR Athletics

European Cup (athletics)
European Cup (athletics)
European Cup (athletics)
International athletics competitions hosted by France